Sipí is a municipality and town in the Chocó Department, Colombia.

An 1853 watercolor by Manuel María Paz showing a house in Sipí, built on a raised platform with a notched treetrunk for steps, is held by the National Library of Colombia.

Climate
Sipí has a very wet tropical rainforest climate (Af) with very heavy rainfall year-round.

References 

Municipalities of Chocó Department